Bath's city walls (also referred to as borough walls) were a sequence of defensive structures built around the city of Bath in England. Roman in origin, then restored by the Anglo-Saxons, and later strengthened in the High medieval period, the walls formed a complete circuit, covering the historic core of the modern city, an area of approximately  including the Roman Baths and medieval Bath Abbey. In the present-day however, the walls have largely disappeared, though the route they took is evident from the street layout; one of the gates partially remains.

History
Bath's first walls were built by the Romans, to surround their town (known then as Aquae Sulis), probably in the 3rd century. The Anglo-Saxons by the 10th century had established Bath as a fortified burh (borough), utilising the existing town walls, and maintaining Bath as a centre of regional power. Bath, located on the northern edge of the kingdom of Wessex, would have guarded against any attack from neighbouring Mercia, which was held by the Danes for a time.

The height of the walls was increased on the orders of King Stephen during The Anarchy. Bath's medieval walls included four gates. The North and South Gates were both decorated with a number of statues, including the legendary King Bladud and Edward III. The two gates were linked to local churches, St Mary's and St James' respectively. The North and South Gates were demolished in 1755, and the West Gate was demolished in the 1760s.

During the Second World War bomb damage to Bath revealed parts of the city walls previously lost from view behind other buildings. The remaining wall circuit is now protected as a Grade II listed building and a scheduled monument. Only part of one of Bath's medieval gates still survives, the East Gate, located near Pulteney Bridge.

In 1980 a timber barricade was found close to the north city wall. This may have been erected in the Saxon era to allow repair of the stonework. A sword from the late tenth or early 11th century was also found, which may date from a skirmish in 1013.

Circuit

Starting at the Northgate and running anti-clockwise, the wall ran along the north side of the Upper Borough Walls street — Trim Street lies outside. A section of the wall was recently discovered below where Burton Street now crosses over the circuit. After passing in front of the Theatre Royal, the wall then ran along the east side of Sawclose to the Westgate and continued down the east side of the street called Westgate Buildings.

The route of wall went through the now open space at St James's Rampire and then along the south side of the Lower Borough Walls street to the Southgate. Continuing anti-clockwise, the wall passed through the southern part of the Marks & Spencers building, where the Ham Gate was, and then through the buildings between (and running parallel to) Old Orchard Street and North Parade Buildings. The route continued along Terrace Walk and to the west of the Parade Gardens and passed under the back of The Empire. At Boat Stall Lane are the remains of the only remaining gate — the East Gate. From here the wall passed under the Guildhall Market, Victoria Art Gallery and Bridge Street, before meeting the North Gate having passed under the buildings at the corner of Bridge Street and Northgate Street.

The route is marked on Ordnance Survey mapping of 1:10,000 scale and better, including on historic Ordnance Survey maps.

See also
List of town walls in England and Wales
Timeline of Bath, Somerset
Chester city walls
York city walls

References

Bibliography
Creighton, Oliver Hamilton and Robert Higham. (2005) Medieval Town Walls: an Archaeology and Social History of Urban Defence. Stroud, UK: Tempus. .

Roman town of Bath
City walls in the United Kingdom
Grade II listed buildings in Bath, Somerset
Scheduled monuments in Bath and North East Somerset